The Suzuki FX125 is an underbone motorcycle manufactured in Malaysia from 1998 and it is one of the most powerful 4 stroke engines. 

It uses a 5 speed  DOHC four-valve single-cylinder engine. This engine is of the same design as the  engine which powers its sports bike, the Suzuki FXR150 and another underbone, the Suzuki Raider 150. This engine features SACS Suzuki Advanced Cooling System in which oil as well as air is used to cool the engine. To cool the oil, the engine is fitted with an external oil cooler.

Unlike the Suzuki FXR150 and Suzuki Raider 150, which is 150cc engines and a 6 speed manual, the Suzuki FX125 and Raider 125 engines are 125cc and a 5 speed manual. The frame, rear suspension, seat, front wheel and front brakes are identical to that of the Suzuki Raider 150.

The main features are rear monoshock rear suspension, a manual five-speed short gear ratio transmission, dual camshaft engine, lightweight chassis construction, 17 inch alloy cast wheels and front disc brake, most of which are rarely found in underbones. Some suzuki FX125s were supplied with spoked wheels.

The dash unit has an analogue speedometer and lights to show turn signal, top gear, neutral and high beam peos.

The Suzuki FX125 was sold mostly in Malaysia, Viet Nam and in small numbers in New Zealand and Greece.

Technical data

References

External links
 Official Suzuki Philippines Website
 Official Suzuki Malaysia Website

FX125
Motorcycles introduced in 1998